The River Glen is a seven mile long tributary of the River Till flowing through  Northumberland, England. The College Burn and Bowmont Water, both flowing out of the Cheviot Hills, meet near Kirknewton to form the River Glen. The Glen flows past the small settlements of Yeavering, Lanton, Coupland, Akeld and Ewart, before joining the Till.

History 
The area around the Glen is rich in historical and archaeological interest. Iron Age hillforts on peaks to the south of the river overlook the Anglo-Saxon settlement and palace site at Yeavering, where St. Paulinus baptised new converts and, according to Bede, "washed them with the water of absolution in the river Glen, which is close by" (Tomlinson, 1888, p. 504).

The area around the Glen was the setting for some of the bloodiest border warfare between Scotland and England. The Battle of Humbleton Hill was fought near the river in 1402, as was the Battle of Geteryne (Yeavering) in 1415.

Arthurian myth
A reference to a similarly named river in Historia Brittonum by the Welsh author Nennius, some (Ekwal, 1928; Hunt, 2005) have hypothesized that the legendary British warrior Arthur began his campaign against Anglo-Saxon invaders near the confluence of the Glen and Till: 
Then it was, that Arthur, with all the kings and military force of Britain, fought against the Saxons. And though there were many more noble than himself, yet he was twelve times chosen their commander, and was as often conqueror. The first battle in which he was engaged, was at the mouth of the river Glein.

Hydrology
Between 1966 and 2010 the flow of the Glen, was measured in its lower reaches at a weir near Kirknewton.

See also
 Battle of Humbleton Hill
 Yeavering
 Wooler
 History of Northumberland
 Kirknewton, Northumberland

References

Sources

Ekwall, E. (1928). English river names (reprinted 1968). Oxford, UK: Oxford University Press.
Hunt, A. (2005). From Glein to Camlann: The life and death of King Arthur. Vortigern Studies.
Tomlinson, W. W. (1888). Comprehensive guide to the county of Northumberland (reprinted 1968). Trowbridge, UK: Redwood.

External links

Glen
History of Northumberland
2Glen